Alpaidze may refer to:

People
 Galaktion Alpaidze (1916-2006), a Soviet military leader

Objects
 11824 Alpaidze, a main belt asteroid